Cavanna is a surname and may refer to:
 Elise Cavanna (1902–1963), American film actress, stage comedian, dancer, and artist
 François Cavanna (1923–2014), French author and newspaper editor
 Giuseppe Cavanna (1905–1976), Italian football goalkeeper
 Guelfo Cavanna (1850–1920), Italian entomologist
 Luigi Cavanna, Italian oncologist

Cavanna is also a surname of a noble Italian family, see Cavanna family.

Surnames of Italian origin